Patrik Maier (born 6 November 1996) is a Slovak professional ice hockey defenceman for HC Slovan Bratislava of the Tipos Extraliga.

Career
Maier was a member of Slovan Bratislava's academy and also played two seasons in Western Hockey League, playing for the Kamloops Blazers, who drafted him 6th overall in the 2014 CHL Import Draft and the Moose Jaw Warriors. On May 31, 2016, Maier returned to Slovakia and signed for HC Nové Zámky of the Tipsport Liga. 

On July 20, 2017, Maier moved to the Czech Extraliga and signed for HC Bílí Tygři Liberec and played 34 games over two seasons. He returned to Slovakia on June 5, 2019, signing for HKM Zvolen. He would leave the team by February however and join HC '05 Banská Bystrica. On July 24, 2020, Maier returned to Slovan Bratislava.

Career statistics

Regular season and playoffs

International

Awards and honors

References

External links
 

1968 births
Living people
HC '05 Banská Bystrica players
HC Benátky nad Jizerou players
HC Bílí Tygři Liberec players
Kamloops Blazers players
Moose Jaw Warriors players
HC Nové Zámky players
Slovak ice hockey defencemen
HC Slovan Bratislava players
Ice hockey people from Bratislava
HKM Zvolen players
Slovak expatriate ice hockey players in Canada
Slovak expatriate ice hockey players in the Czech Republic